The Trews is the eponymously titled fifth studio album by Canadian rock band, The Trews. The album debuted at No. 3 on the Canadian Albums Chart, the band's highest position on that chart in their history.

Track listing
 "Rise in the Wake" – 4:00
 "Age of Miracles" – 3:34
 "Permanent Love" – 4:44
 "The Sentimentalist" – 4:18
 "65 Roses" – 4:00
 "What's Fair Is Fair" – 3:18
 "Where There's Love" – 4:40
 "In the Morning" (featuring Serena Ryder) – 4:34
 "New King" – 2:38
 "Living the Dream" – 4:56
 "Under the Sun" – 3:59

Personnel
Colin MacDonald – lead vocals, guitar
John-Angus MacDonald – guitars, background vocals
Jack Syperek – bass, background vocals
Sean Dalton – drums, background vocals

Additional musicians
Jeff Heisholt – keys
Gavin Brown – keys, percussion
Serena Ryder – vocals
Anne Bourne – cello
Natalie Aikens, Caitlyn Anderson, Marisa Bruch, Samantha Chappell, Tim Des Islets, Erin Kinghorn, Maureen Leeson, Karen McDonnell, Paul Morris, Siobhan Morris, Sharon Vernon – gang vocals

References

2014 albums
The Trews albums
Albums produced by Gavin Brown (musician)
Albums recorded at Noble Street Studios